The 2nd Asian Cross Country Championships took place 1993 in Jakarta, Indonesia. Team rankings were decided by a combination of each nation's top three athletes finishing positions.

Medalists

Medal table

References
Results

Asian Cross Country Championships
Asian Cross Country
Asian Cross Country
Asian Cross Country
Sport in Jakarta
International athletics competitions hosted by Indonesia